The 2004 Stan James World Matchplay was held between 25–31 July 2004 at the Winter Gardens, Blackpool, and was won for the fifth year in a row by Phil Taylor.

Prize money
The prize fund was £100,000.

Seeds

Results

World Matchplay (darts)
World Matchplay Darts